Anastasia was a daughter of Roman Emperor Constantius Chlorus and Flavia Maximiana Theodora, and half sister of Emperor Constantine I. She was married to Bassianus, who was found to be plotting against Constantine and executed. She is reputed to have built the public baths at Constantinople, which were named after her. The name Anastasia may indicate a sympathy on her father's part towards Christian or Jewish culture.

References

4th-century Roman women
Daughters of Roman emperors
Constantinian dynasty
Flavii
Valerii
Year of birth unknown
Year of death unknown